Yuleidys Cascaret Iznaga (born  21 November 1978) is a Cuban former rower who competed at two Summer Olympics.

Biography
Cascaret, who was born in Guantánamo, won gold medals for Cuba at the 2003 Pan American Games as a member of their coxless four and quadruple sculls teams. At the 2004 Summer Olympics he competed in the singles sculls and made the B final, finishing 12th overall. He won gold again at the 2007 Pan American Games, in the quadruple sculls, the same event that he represented Cuba in at both 2007 World Rowing Championships and the 2008 Summer Olympics.

References

External links
Yuleidys Cascaret at Sports Reference

1978 births
Living people
Cuban male rowers
Olympic rowers of Cuba
Rowers at the 2004 Summer Olympics
Rowers at the 2008 Summer Olympics
Pan American Games gold medalists for Cuba
Pan American Games bronze medalists for Cuba
Pan American Games medalists in rowing
Rowers at the 2007 Pan American Games
Medalists at the 2003 Pan American Games
Medalists at the 2007 Pan American Games